Elaine Mokhtefi (born 1928) is an American and Algerian activist, translator, and writer. Born in New York, Mokhtefi began working as a translator for anti-racist and anti-colonial activist movements after moving to Paris in her twenties. She supported Algerian independence efforts, then lived in Algeria from 1962 until she was forced to leave the country in 1974. Her memoir of her time there, Algiers, Third World Capital: Freedom Fighters, Revolutionaries, Black Panthers, was published by Verso Books in 2018.

Early life 
Elaine Mokhtefi was born Elaine Klein in 1928 in Hempstead, New York. Her family was secular Jewish, and she described facing antisemitism throughout her childhood. Her parents were not particularly political, though her father at one point attended Socialist Party meetings, and she described her mother as "especially anti-racist."

At age 16, she enrolled at Wesleyan College, a Christian school in Georgia. Mokhtefi rebelled against the segregationist environment, and she was kicked out after a year.

After returning to New York, she studied languages and joined the anti-war group United World Federalists. In 1951, at age 23, she traveled to Paris from New York by boat, a trip that took 14 days, and sought work there as a translator.

Activism 
Mokhtefi became an anti-racist and anti-colonial activist very early on.

In 1952, after arriving in France, she attended the International Workers' Day parade in Paris, where she met Algerian trade unionists. Becoming more deeply involved in this activism, she participated in the All-African Peoples' Conference in Accra, Ghana, in 1958. There, she met Frantz Fanon and Mohamed Sahnoun. Mokhtefi decided to work alongside them in support of the anti-colonial Algerian National Liberation Front (FLN). She joined Sahnoun in New York and settled there in 1960. In New York, she began working for the local bureau of the Provisional Government of the Algerian Republic and the FLN. She also took classes at New York University.

As Fanon's health declined in 1961, eventually leading to his death, Mokhtefi visited him regularly and supported his family, helping to take care of his 6-year-old son, Olivier.

After Algeria gained independence in 1962, Mokhtefi settled in Algiers, where she remained for 12 years. She was hired as the only American in the new administration and worked as a fixer, taking on whatever task arose. In 1969, she was put in charge of organizing the first Pan-African Cultural Festival in Algiers. She also helped welcome members of national liberation movements across Africa (Mozambique, Angola, South Africa) and international Black Panther members to Algeria. In particular, she helped organize the clandestine exile of Eldridge Cleaver in Algeria after he fled the United States via Cuba. She also met the likes of Fidel Castro, Houari Boumédiène, Ahmed Ben Bella, and Ho Chi Minh through her work.

Mokhtefi was forced to leave Algeria in 1974, after refusing to inform on a friend amid power struggles in Algiers. She settled in Paris, where she lived for 20 years before returning again to New York in 1994. She was not allowed to return to Algeria for over four decades.

Her activism continued in New York, where she has participated in antiwar actions, climate marches, Occupy Wall Street, and pro-Palestinian protests.

Writing 
During her time in Algeria, Mokhtefi worked as a journalist for the Algeria Press Service, covering news from the Third World in particular.

After leaving for France, she and her husband co-wrote several books on history for young readers.

In 2018, she published the memoir Algiers, Third World Capital: Freedom Fighters, Revolutionaries, Black Panthers. It was published the following year in France under the title Alger, capitale de la révolution: De Fanon aux Black Panthers, with Mokhtefi completing the translation into French herself. It was also released in Algeria in 2019.

Personal life 
Elaine Klein took the name Elaine Mokhtefi after marrying the writer and former Algerian National Liberation Army member Mokhtar Mokhtefi. The couple met in Algiers in 1972, then he joined her when she was forced to leave the country two years later. They lived together in Paris for two decades, then in New York for another two decades until his death in 2015.

References 

1928 births
20th-century American women writers
Algerian women in politics
Algerian women journalists
Algerian revolutionaries
Jewish American writers
Jewish women writers
Activists from New York (state)
Members of the National Liberation Front (Algeria)
People of the Algerian War
American expatriates in France
American emigrants to Algeria
Living people
Female revolutionaries